Chase-Coletta House, also known as the Lillie Ray Chase House, is a historic home located at Burnsville, Yancey County, North Carolina. It was built in 1914–1915, and is a -story, rectangular, Bungalow / American Craftsman style frame dwelling. It sits on a brick foundation and is sheathed in weatherboard.  It features large gable dormers, a sleeping porch, and a hip roofed wraparound porch on brick piers. Also on the property is a contributing shed (c. 1925).

It was listed on the National Register of Historic Places in 2004.

References 

Houses on the National Register of Historic Places in North Carolina
Houses completed in 1915
Houses in Yancey County, North Carolina
National Register of Historic Places in Yancey County, North Carolina
1915 establishments in North Carolina